The Monotrysia are a group of moths in the lepidopteran order, not currently considered to be a natural group or clade. Apart from the recently discovered family Andesianidae, most of the group consists of small, relatively understudied species. The group is so named because the female has a single genital opening for mating and laying eggs, in contrast to the rest of the Lepidoptera (Ditrysia), which have two female reproductive openings. They comprise all of the group Heteroneura apart from the Ditrysia.

See also

References

Further reading
Davis D. R. (1999). The Monotrysian Heteroneura. Pages 65–90 in: Lepidoptera: Moths and Butterflies. 1. Evolution, Systematics, and Biogeography. Handbook of Zoology Vol. IV, Part 35. N. P. Kristensen, ed. De Gruyter, Berlin and New York.

External links 
Neolepidoptera

 
Obsolete arthropod taxa